SMS Hildebrand was the fifth vessel of the six-member Siegfried class of coastal defense ships (Küstenpanzerschiffe) built for the German Imperial Navy. Hildebrand was built by the Kaiserliche Werft Kiel shipyard between 1890 and 1893, and was armed with a main battery of three  guns. She served in the German fleet throughout the 1890s and was rebuilt in 1900–1902. She served in the VI Battle Squadron after the outbreak of World War I in August 1914, but saw no action. Hildebrand was demobilized in 1915 and used as a barracks ship thereafter. She ran aground while en route to the Netherlands for scrapping in 1919, and was eventually broken up in situ in 1933.

Design

In the late 1880s, the German  (Imperial Navy) grappled with the problem of what type of capital ship to build in the face of limited naval budgets (owing to parliamentary objections to naval spending and the cost of dredging the Kaiser Wilhelm Canal). General Leo von Caprivi, the new  (Chief of the Admiralty), requested a series of design proposals, which ranged in size from small  coastal defense ships to heavily-armed  ocean-going battleships.

Her hull had a long forecastle deck that extended most of the vessel's length. She was also fitted with a pronounced ram bow. Hildebrand had a crew of 20 officers and 256 enlisted men.

Her propulsion system consisted of two vertical 3-cylinder triple-expansion engines, each driving a screw propeller. Steam for the engines was provided by four coal-fired fire-tube boilers that were vented through a single funnel.

The ship was armed with a main battery of three  K L/35 guns mounted in three single gun turrets. Two were placed side by side forward, and the third was located aft of the main superstructure. They were supplied with a total of 204 rounds of ammunition. For defense against torpedo boats, the ship was also equipped with a secondary battery of eight  SK L/30 guns in single mounts. Hildebrand also carried four  torpedo tubes, all in swivel mounts on the deck. One was at the bow, another at the stern, and two amidships.

Modifications

Hildebrand was modified during construction to serve as a divisional flagship, receiving additional facilities and equipment to support an admiral and his staff. In 1897, the ship had her anti-torpedo nets removed.

Hildebrand was extensively rebuilt between 1901 and 1902 in an attempt to improve her usefulness. The lengthened hull space was used to install additional boilers; her old fire-tube boilers were replaced with more efficient water-tube boilers, and a second funnel was added. Her secondary battery was increased to ten 8.8 cm guns, and the 35 cm torpedo tubes were replaced with three  tubes. Her crew increased to 20 officers and 287 enlisted men. Work was completed by 1900.

Service history

Construction – 1899

The ship was commissioned on 28 October 1893 to begin sea trials, though her initial working up period was interrupted by boiler leaks that had to be repaired. After completing her trials, she was briefly assigned as the guard ship in Kiel from 13 to 16 December, when the torpedo test ship  was ready to take over the role. Hildebrand thereafter returned to the shipyard for repairs before being recommissioned on 1 August 1894; while she was still in the shipyard,  (KK–Corvette Captain) Hermann da Fonseca-Wollheim took command of the vessel. Four days later, she was assigned to the Reserve Division of the North Sea, serving as the divisional flagship.

Hildebrand participated in the fleet maneuvers that year, alongside two of her sister ships in IV Division of the fleet. The division was based in Danzig with some torpedo boats and operated as the German fleet in mock engagements with I Division, which simulated the Russian Baltic Fleet. The exercises concluded on 21 September, and the next day, Hildebrand conducted additional trials in the Baltic Sea until 24 October. She returned to Wilhelmshaven three days later, resuming her role as the Reserve Division's flagship. The first half of 1895 passed with the normal peacetime routine of individual ship training and shooting practice. Hildebrand remained the flagship of her division in the squadron, again under Oldekop's command from 11 to 26 June. During this period, she was present for the opening of the Kaiser Wilhelm Canal on the 20th. The fleet assembled for annual maneuvers on 19 August; the exercises concluded on 15 September. KK Georg Alexander von Müller served as the ship's captain during the maneuvers. Hildebrands sister  replaced her in II Squadron on 27 September, allowing her to return to Wilhelmshaven, where she was decommissioned to return to the Reserve Division.

The ship was recommissioned in 1896 to resume her role as the flagship of IV Division, II Squadron on 9 August for that year's fleet exercises; at that time, the divisional commander was KAdm Walther Koch. The maneuvers were held in the Baltic and North Seas and concluded on 15 September. Hildebrand was again decommissioned in Wilhelmshaven thereafter. Hildebrand was recommissioned in 1897 under the command of KK Georg Janke, as in previous years, to participate in the fleet maneuvers. She served as the flagship of II Squadron as well as the subordinate III Division; the squadron commander was at that time KAdm Paul Hoffmann. The unit was reestablished on 3 August and thereafter steamed to Danzig Bay, where the fleet had assembled by 15 August. The exercises concluded in mid-September and II Squadron was again disbanded on the 21st in Wilhelmshaven. Hildebrand was decommissioned and remained out of service through 1898. The ship was recommissioned for the 1899 fleet maneuvers, once again serving as the II Squadron flagship under KAdm Hoffmann as of 1 August. The exercises lasted from 16 August to 16 September, and Hildebrand was again decommissioned six days later.

1900–1914

Hildebrand was recommissioned on 26 March 1900, under the command of KK Hermann Lilie, to replace Beowulf as the deputy command flagship of the Reserve Coastal Defense Division. Over the following months, she embarked on training cruises, at times in company with the division flagship, Frithjof, including a visit to Norway in May that included stops in Gudvangen from 19 to 22 May and Bergen from 22 to 25 May. She operated with II Squadron during the fleet maneuvers that year, once again resuming her role as squadron flagship, flying the flag of KAdm Volkmar von Arnim. The exercises began on 15 August and concluded a month later and the squadron was again disbanded on 22 September. Hildebrand then moved to Danzig, where she was decommissioned on 2 October in preparation for a major reconstruction at the  there. She was transferred to the Reserve Division of the Baltic Sea at the same time. Work on the ship started in early 1901, and on 16 June, cutting of the hull began. The reconstruction was completed in mid-1902.

The ship was recommissioned on 1 July 1902 and returned to II Squadron on 30 July, taking up the position of deputy commander flagship, flying the pennant of KAdm Carl Galster. She took part in the fleet maneuvers from 17 August to 18 September. Following the end of the exercises, KK Wilhelm Becker took command of the vessel. As in previous years, the squadron was disbanded on 21 September, but Hildebrand remained in commission and thereafter cruised the Baltic, visiting ports as far as Helsingfors. KK Paul Schlieper temporarily relieved Becker from May to July, when now- (FK—Frigate Captain) Becker returned to the vessel. II Squadron was reformed on 4 July 1903 and KAdm Rudolph von Eickstedt, the deputy squadron commander, came aboard Hildebrand on 30 July. The year's training maneuvers began soon thereafter and concluded on 12 September. With work on Hildebrand completed by 31 October, Fritze returned to the vessel and KK Christian Schütz replaced Becker as the ship's commander. At that time, the squadron also included Beowulf, Frithjof, and the coastal defense ship .

Hildebrand remained in the role into 1904; the squadron conducted unit training in mid-1904, followed by a cruise to the Netherlands and Norway in July and August. During the voyage, she stopped in Nieuwediep and Den Helder in the Netherlands and in Bergen, Norway. The ships participated in the annual maneuvers, but following their conclusion, Fritze permanently transferred his flag to Kaiser Friedrich III on 17 September. Hildebrand was then taken to Danzig, where she was decommissioned six days later and allocated to the Reserve Division of the Baltic Sea. Hildebrand was reactivated just once in the next decade, in 1909, to participate in the annual maneuvers as part of III Battle Squadron, part of what was now the High Seas Fleet. The ship was assigned to V Division, along with Beowulf, Siegfried, and Heimdall. The squadron was assembled by 27 July for unit training before the fleet maneuvers began on 16 August. The exercises ended on 6 September, and on the 15th, the squadron was disbanded and Hildebrand was decommissioned in Danzig once more.

World War I

Following the outbreak of World War I in July 1914, Hildebrand and the other coastal defense ships were mobilized to form VI Battle Squadron. Hildebrand was recommissioned on 12 August, becoming the flagship of the squadron commander, KAdm Richard Eckermann, the same day. The unit consisted of the other five ships of the Siegfried class and the two s. The squadron left Danzig on 21 August for Kiel, where they conducted individual and unit training to prepare their crews for wartime service.

By mid-September, VI Squadron was ready to begin coastal defense patrols in the German Bight, operating primarily in the Jade Bay and the river mouths of Germany's North Sea coast. While there, the squadron was attached to the High Seas Fleet. On 28 September, Hildebrand came to the assistance of Hagen when the latter had run aground off Voslapp and successfully pulled her sister free. When the battlecruisers of I Scouting Group conducted the Raid on Yarmouth on 2–3 November, Hildebrand and the other ships were sent to the outer Jade roadstead to cover their return. Hildebrand was sent to assist the steamship  in the outer Jade on 9 December, but was unable to tow her free and instead ran aground herself. Shipyard tugs arrived the next day and pulled both ships free.

After returning to service in April 1915, Hildebrand was initially sent to the Jade, before being moved to the mouth of the Elbe. By that time, the German naval command had come to the conclusion that the British Royal Navy would no longer attempt to break into the German Bight or attack coastal shipping in the various river ports. Accordingly, they disbanded VI Squadron on 31 August and dispersed its ships. Hildebrand and Odin were allocated to the harbor flotilla in the Elbe to serve as local guard ships, Hildebrand becoming the flagship of the local command. At the same time, FK Erich von Zeppelin became the ship's captain. Hildebrand saw little activity here and on 9 January 1916, she left for the Baltic, passing through Kiel before arriving in Danzig on 11 January. There, she was decommissioned five days later. She was then used as a distilling ship and an accommodations hulk in Libau and later Windau. While in Windau, her electrical generators were also used to power lights in the harbor. On 17 June 1919, she was stricken from the naval register. She was sold to the Netherlands for scrapping that year, but ran aground off Scheveningen in a severe storm while en route to the breakers on 21 December. The six man crew was successful evacuated from the wreck. In 1933, the vessel was blown up and subsequently broken up in situ.

Notes

References

Further reading
 

1892 ships
World War I coastal defense ships of Germany
Siegfried-class coastal defense ships
Ships built in Kiel